Acanthoscelides seminulum is a species of leaf beetle in the family Chrysomelidae. It is found in North America.

References

 "Catalog of Leaf Beetles of America North of Mexico", Ed Riley, Shawn Clark, and Terry Seeno. 2003. Coleopterists Society.
 Kingsolver, John M. (2004). "Handbook of the Bruchidae of the United States and Canada (Insecta, Coleoptera), vol. 1". USDA Technical Bulletin, no. 1912, xi + 324.

Further reading

 Arnett, R.H. Jr., M. C. Thomas, P. E. Skelley and J. H. Frank. (eds.). (2002). American Beetles, Volume II: Polyphaga: Scarabaeoidea through Curculionoidea. CRC Press LLC, Boca Raton, FL.
 Arnett, Ross H. (2000). American Insects: A Handbook of the Insects of America North of Mexico. CRC Press.
 Richard E. White. (1983). Peterson Field Guides: Beetles. Houghton Mifflin Company.

Bruchinae
Beetles described in 1873